Weekes is a small, abandoned village in a valley between Garibaldi Hill and Richmond Hill, in the St Anthony Region of Montserrat. It is abandoned because it lies in the 'uninhabitable zone' surrounding the Soufrière Hills volcano after the 1997 eruption of Chances Peak.

References 

Former populated places in Montserrat